Bursa Merinos Energy Museum is a technology museum dedicated to electricity, which was  established in 2012 in the defunct power plant of an abandoned textile factory in Bursa, northwestern  Turkey.

Merinos factory was one of the state-owned factories established in 1938. It was a textile factory using the wool of merino. With additions in 1944 and 1946 it became the biggest factory of its kind in Balkan and Mideastern countries. However, in 2004 the factory was closed within the scope of privatization program. Its  land lot together  with the infrastructure was handed over to the Bursa Metropolitan Municipality.	

On 7 September 2012, the municipality established an energy museum. In the museum, the role of electricity in the civilization is emphasized. The history of electricity in the World, in Turkey and in Bursa, the illumination gadgets and the production of electricity are shown by the photographs and animations.

References

Energy
Technology museums in Turkey
2012 establishments in Turkey
Museums established in 2012
Electric power in Turkey
Osmangazi
Energy museums